2-Indolinethione is an organic compound with the formula . It is a derivative of dihydroindole containing a thione group. The compound is a tautomer of 2-mercaptoindole.  A white solid, it is prepared by thiation of 2-oxindole. 2-Indolinethione is a precursor to several natural products.

References

Indolines
Thioamides